The 2021 First Responder Bowl was a college football bowl game played on December 28, 2021, with kickoff at 3:15 p.m. EST (2:15 p.m. local CST) and televised on ESPN. It was the 12th edition of the First Responder Bowl, and was one of the 2021–22 bowl games concluding the 2021 FBS football season. Sponsored by fire and water cleanup and restoration company Servpro, the game was officially known as the Servpro First Responder Bowl.

Teams
While the bowl has tie-ins with the American Athletic Conference (AAC), Atlantic Coast Conference (ACC), and Big 12 Conference, the actual matchup featured teams from the ACC and Mountain West Conference (MWC). This was the first time Air Force and Louisville ever played each other.

Air Force Falcons

Louisville Cardinals

Game summary

Statistics

References

Externals links
Game statistics at statbroadcast.com

First Responder Bowl
First Responder Bowl
Air Force Falcons football bowl games
Louisville Cardinals football bowl games
First Responder Bowl
First Responder Bowl